The 1997 Walker Cup, the 36th Walker Cup Match, was played on August 9 and 10, 1997, at Quaker Ridge Golf Club in Scarsdale, New York. The event was won by the United States 18 to 6.

Format
The format for play on Saturday and Sunday was the same. There were four matches of foursomes in the morning and eight singles matches in the afternoon. In all, 24 matches were played.

Each of the 24 matches is worth one point in the larger team competition. If a match is all square after the 18th hole extra holes are not played. Rather, each side earns ½ a point toward their team total. The team that accumulates at least 12½ points wins the competition. If the two teams are tied, the previous winner retains the trophy.

Teams
Ten players for the USA and Great Britain & Ireland participate in the event plus one non-playing captain for each team.

Saturday's matches

Morning foursomes

Afternoon singles

Sunday's matches

Morning foursomes

Afternoon singles

References
 https://web.archive.org/web/20120307075814/http://www.golftoday.co.uk/news/yeartodate/news97/ukwalk1.htm
 https://web.archive.org/web/20120307075827/http://www.golftoday.co.uk/news/yeartodate/news97/uswalk1.htm
 https://web.archive.org/web/20120307075839/http://www.golftoday.co.uk/news/yeartodate/news97/uswalk2.htm
 http://www.deseretnews.com/article/568992/Eight-players-selected-for-97-US-Walker-Cup-team.html
 https://web.archive.org/web/20120307075848/http://www.golftoday.co.uk/news/yeartodate/news97/walk1.htm
 https://web.archive.org/web/20120307075852/http://www.golftoday.co.uk/news/yeartodate/news97/walk2.htm
 https://web.archive.org/web/20120307075912/http://www.golftoday.co.uk/news/yeartodate/news97/walk3.htm
 https://web.archive.org/web/20120307075919/http://www.golftoday.co.uk/news/yeartodate/news97/walk4.htm
 https://web.archive.org/web/19990222115432/http://www.usga.com/champs/walker_results_01.html
 https://web.archive.org/web/19991118115742/http://www.usga.com/champs/walker_results.html

Walker Cup
Golf in New York (state)
Walker Cup
Walker Cup
Walker Cup